The Municipality of Gorenja Vas–Poljane is a municipality in Slovenia. Its administrative seat is Gorenja Vas.

Settlements
In addition to the municipal seat of Gorenja Vas, the municipality also includes the following settlements:

 Bačne
 Brebovnica
 Bukov Vrh
 Čabrače
 Četena Ravan
 Debeni
 Delnice
 Dobje
 Dobravšce
 Dolenčice
 Dolenja Dobrava
 Dolenja Ravan
 Dolenja Žetina
 Dolenje Brdo
 Dolge Njive
 Fužine
 Goli Vrh
 Gorenja Dobrava
 Gorenja Ravan
 Gorenja Žetina
 Gorenje Brdo
 Hlavče Njive
 Hobovše pri Stari Oselici
 Hotavlje
 Hotovlja
 Jarčje Brdo
 Javorje
 Javorjev Dol
 Jazbine
 Jelovica
 Kladje
 Kopačnica
 Kremenik
 Krivo Brdo
 Krnice pri Novakih
 Lajše
 Laniše
 Laze
 Leskovica
 Lom nad Volčo
 Lovsko Brdo
 Lučine
 Malenski Vrh
 Mlaka nad Lušo
 Murave
 Nova Oselica
 Podgora
 Podjelovo Brdo
 Podobeno
 Podvrh
 Poljane nad Škofjo Loko
 Predmost
 Prelesje
 Robidnica
 Smoldno
 Sovodenj
 Srednja Vas–Poljane
 Srednje Brdo
 Stara Oselica
 Studor
 Suša
 Todraž
 Trebija
 Vinharje
 Volaka
 Volča
 Žabja Vas
 Zadobje
 Zakobiljek
 Zapreval
 Žirovski Vrh Svetega Antona
 Žirovski Vrh Svetega Urbana

Notable people
Notable people born in the municipality include:

Anton Ažbe (1862–1905), painter and educator
Miha Krek (1897–1969), conservative politician
Ignatius Mrak (1818–1901), Slovenian American Roman Catholic missionary and prelate
Ivan Tavčar (1851–1923), writer and Liberal politician
Aleš Ušeničnik (1868–1952), Neo-Thomist philosopher

References

External links

Municipality of Gorenja Vas–Poljane on Geopedia

 
1994 establishments in Slovenia
Gorenja Vas-Poljane